Şirvan District is a district of Siirt Province in Turkey. The town of Şirvan is the seat and the district had a population of 21,321 in 2021.

The district is fully Kurdish.

Settlements 
The district encompasses the belde of Şirvan, fifty-eight villages and fifty hamlets.

Villages 

 Adıgüzel
 Akçayar
 Akgeçit
 Akyokuş
 Bayındır
 Belençay
 Boylu
 Cevizdalı
 Cevizlik
 Çeltikyolu
 Çınarlı
 Daltepe
 Damlı
 Demirkapı
 Derinçay
 Dişlinar
 Doğruca
 Durankaya
 Elmadalı
 Gözlüce
 Gümüş
 Hürmüz
 İkizler
 İncekaya
 Kalkancık
 Kapılı
 Karaca
 Kasımlı
 Kayahisar
 Kesmetaş
 Kirazlı
 Kömürlü
 Madenköy
 Meşecik
 Nallıkaya
 Ormanbağı
 Ormanlı
 Otluk
 Oya
 Özpınar
 Pirinçli
 Sarıdana
 Sırçalı
 Soğanlı
 Soğuksu
 Suludere
 Suluyazı
 Taşlı
 Taşyaka
 Tatlıpayam
 Yağcılar
 Yalkaya
 Yamaçlı
 Yarımtepe
 Yaylacı
 Yayladağ
 Yedikapı
 Yolbaşı

References 

Districts of Siirt Province